Kenneth Villiers (1912–1992) was a British film actor. He also directed three documentary films.

Selected filmography
 Mr. Cohen Takes a Walk (1935)
 They Didn't Know (1936)
 Broken Blossoms (1936)
 Things to Come (1936)

References

Bibliography
 Marshall, Wendy L. William Beaudine: From Silents to Television. Scarecrow Press, 2005.
 https://www.independent.co.uk/news/people/obituary-kenneth-villiers-1580529.html

External links

1912 births
1992 deaths
British film directors
British male film actors
People from Colombo
British people in British Ceylon